R701 road may refer to:
 R701 road (Ireland)
 R701 road (South Africa)